Adriaan "Attie" Jacobus van Heerden (10 March 1898 – 14 October 1965) was a South African Olympian 400-metre hurdler, rugby union and professional rugby league footballer who played in the 1920s. Attie van Heerden played for Wigan in the same era as fellow South African Afrikaner David Booysen.

Olympic appearance
Born 10 March 1898 in Boshof, Free State, Attie van Heerden participated in the 400-metre hurdles in the 1920 Summer Olympics in Antwerp, Belgium. He was eliminated at Round One, Heat Two as he did not finish. Attie van Heerden's personal best for the 400-metre hurdles was 57.9 seconds set in 1920.

Attie van Heerden was crowned as the South African champion in the 120-yard hurdles (16.0 seconds), as well as in the 440-yard hurdles (58.2 seconds) at the South African Championships held in Johannesburg in 1920.

Attie van Heerden is the only rugby Springbok to have participated at the Olympic Games.

Playing career

International honours
Attie van Heerden won caps for South Africa (RU) while at Transvaal in 1921 against New Zealand (2 matches), and won cap(s) for Other Nationalities (RL) while at Wigan in 1923-26 against England.

Attie van Heerden did not participate in the Currie Cup Tournament of 1920, held at Bloemfontein and Kimberley, due to his participation at the 1920 Olympic Games in Antwerp, Belgium. However, he was still selected for the Springbok rugby team for the 1921 tour to Australia and New Zealand.

Attie van Heerden scored the first ever try in a South Africa versus New Zealand international rugby union match. He scored five tries in the first official match of the 1921 tour, against New South Wales, this was a Springbok record until 1956, when it was improved by Roy Dryburgh, who scored six tries. Attie van Heerden scored 42 points, from 14 tries, and was the top try scorer on the 1921 South Africa rugby union tour of Australia and New Zealand.

Championship final appearances
Attie van Heerden played in Wigan's 22-10 defeat by Batley in the Championship Final during the 1923–24 season, and scored a try in the 22-10 victory over Warrington in the Championship Final during the 1925–26 season at Knowsley Road, St. Helens on Saturday 8 May 1926.

Challenge Cup Final appearances
Attie van Heerden played , and scored a try in Wigan's 21-4 victory over Oldham in the 1924 Challenge Cup Final during the 1923–24 season at Athletic Grounds, Rochdale on Saturday 12 April 1924.

Attie van Heerden's try was scored between the posts behind a police horse that was on the field of play attempting to keep the 41,831 crowd at bay.

County League appearances
Attie van Heerden played in Wigan's victory in the Lancashire League during the 1925–26 season.

County Cup Final appearances
Attie van Heerden played , i.e. number 5, in Wigan's 11-15 defeat by Swinton in the 1925–26 Lancashire County Cup Final during the 1925–26 season at The Cliff, Broughton on Wednesday 9 December 1925.

School days
Attie van Heerden was a pupil at Paarl Gimnasium school in Paarl, Western Cape Province, South Africa.

Genealogical Information
Van Heerden died 14 October 1965 in Pretoria, Gauteng.

After Rugby
Following his retirement from rugby, Attie van Heerden returned to South Africa, and worked as a security guard for Iscor.

References

Further reading

External links
Search for "Heerden" at rugbyleagueproject.org

Statistics at wigan.rlfans.com

Hoërskool Paarl Gimnasium
Rugby Against Australia – The Early Days by Brian Forsyth

1898 births
1965 deaths
Afrikaner people
Alumni of Paarl Gimnasium
Athletes (track and field) at the 1920 Summer Olympics
Leigh Leopards players
Olympic athletes of South Africa
Other Nationalities rugby league team players
Orange Free State people
People from Tokologo Local Municipality
Rugby league wingers
Rugby union wings
South Africa international rugby union players
South African male hurdlers
South African people of Dutch descent
South African rugby league players
South African rugby union players
Stellenbosch University alumni
Wigan Warriors players